William Nichol (1800-1878)  was an American banker, Whig politician and planter. He served as the mayor of Nashville, Tennessee, from 1835 to 1837.

Early life
He was born on February 12, 1800, in Abingdon, Virginia. His father was Josiah Nichol, an immigrant from Ireland, and his mother, Eleanor (Ryburn) Nichol. They moved to Nashville when he was still a young boy.

Career
He served as the first President of the Bank of Tennessee. From 1835 to 1837, he served as Mayor of Nashville. Later, he was a planter in Davidson County, Tennessee and Arkansas.

Personal life
He married Julia Margaret Lytle on 6 October 1825. His father-in-law, William Lytle, was a wealthy landowner who had served as Captain in the American Revolutionary War. They had four sons, Josiah II, William Lytle, Charles Alexander James Edgar and Harry D., and six daughters, Eleanor Ryburn, Margaret, Ann Lytle, Julia, Jane F. and Lizzie B. Nichol. They resided at Belair, a historic mansion in Nashville from 1835 to his death.

Death
He died on November 23, 1878, and he is buried in the Mount Olivet Cemetery. His wife died in 1890.

Legacy
His granddaughter (Harry's daughter), Julia Nichol Sharpe (1875-1931), was married to William Percy Sharpe, who served as Mayor of Nashville from 1922 to 1924.

References

1800 births
1878 deaths
American people of Irish descent
Politicians from Abingdon, Virginia
Tennessee Whigs
19th-century American politicians
Mayors of Nashville, Tennessee
American bankers
American planters
Burials at Mount Olivet Cemetery (Nashville)